The 1988 Deutsche Tourenwagen Meisterschaft was the fifth season of premier German touring car championship and also third season under the moniker of Deutsche Tourenwagen Meisterschaft.

The championship was run under heavily modified Group A regulations, including the use of air restrictors. The champion was Klaus Ludwig with 5 victories driving a Ford Sierra RS500 Cosworth.

Teams and drivers

References 

Deutsche Tourenwagen Masters seasons
1988 in German motorsport
1988 in West German motorsport